Abdul Aminu (born 21 February 1965) is a Nigerian footballer. He played in ten matches for the Nigeria national football team from 1990 to 1992. He was also named in Nigeria's squad for the 1990 African Cup of Nations tournament.

References

1965 births
Living people
Nigerian footballers
Nigeria international footballers
1990 African Cup of Nations players
Place of birth missing (living people)
Association football defenders